Carlos Ron (born 16 December 1953) is an Ecuadorian footballer. He played in six matches for the Ecuador national football team from 1975 to 1979. He was also part of Ecuador's squad for the 1975 Copa América tournament.

References

1953 births
Living people
Ecuadorian footballers
Ecuador international footballers
Place of birth missing (living people)
Association football midfielders
C.D. El Nacional footballers
Ecuadorian football managers
C.D. El Nacional managers
Ecuador national football team managers